Rauville-la-Place is a commune in the Manche department in Normandy France. It is located just to the northeast of Saint-Sauveur-le-Vicomte. In 2017 the population was 376.

Demography

Population

In 2017 the population of Rauville-la-Place was 376. In 2007 there were 172 multi-person families and forty-eight single person homes (with twenty men and twenty-eight females living alone), 56 were couples without children, 56 couples with children and 12 single-parent families.

Population growth and loss is shown in the following chart:

Homes 
Rauville-la-Place had 227 homes, 172 were primary homes, of which thirty-five were second residences and fifteen were unoccupied. Two-hundred-seventeen of these were houses and three were apartment buildings. Of the 172 primary residences, 139 were occupied by its owners, 37 were occupied  by renters and their families and three were let at no cost. Nine residences had  two bedrooms, 23 had three, 44 had four and the rest had. 131 residences had one parking place on the property, with 82 residences having one vehicle, and 75 having two or more.

Economy 
In 2007, 245 residents were of working age, of which 186 were active and 59 inactive. Of the 186 people considered to be active, 175  were employed and eleven were unemployed. Of the fifty-nine who were inactive, thirty-one were retired, ten were students and eighteen were classified as "other inactive".

Income 
In 2009 there were 172 properties in Rauville-la-Place, with a population of 387. The median annual taxable income per person was 17,816 €.

Economic Activity 
Of the 11 business establishments in Rauville-la-Place in 2007, 1 was a grocer's, 6 were construction businesses, 2 were car repair businesses and 2 were lodging and restaurant businesses.

There were 6 service businesses in Rauville-la-Place in 2009: a bricklayer, a painter and plasterer, a carpenter, a plumber, an electrician and a restaurant.

The only commercial establishment in 2009 was a chemist's shop.

In 2000 there were 28 farms in Rauville-la-Place, occupying a total of 833 hectares.

See also
Communes of the Manche department

References 

Rauvillelaplace